A number of steamships have been named Venus, including

, a Danish cargo ship in service 1921–41
, a Norwegian ocean liner in service 1931–39 and 1948–68
, a Bulgarian cargo ship in service during 1977

Ship names